Chisaka is a Japanese surname. Notable people with the surname include:

, Japanese samurai
, Japanese samurai

Japanese-language surnames